The U.S. Women's Open, one of 15 national golf championships conducted by the United States Golf Association (USGA), is the oldest of the LPGA Tour's five major championships, which includes the Chevron Championship, Women's PGA Championship, Women's Open Championship, and The Evian Championship.

Established  in 1946, the U.S. Women's Open is the only event to have been recognized as a major by the LPGA since the group's founding in 1950. Originally operated by the Women's Professional Golfers  Association (WPGA) for its first three years and the LPGA for the next four, it became a USGA event in 1953. Since 2018, the tournament has normally been held the week after Memorial Day. The U.S. Women's Open is the second major of the LPGA season and has the highest purse in women's golf. The most recent increase, announced in January 2022, saw the purse nearly double from its previous $5.5 million (2019–2021) to $10 million starting in 2022. The 2022 purse increase came about when the nonprofit health care company ProMedica was announced as the tournament's presenting sponsor.

For 2020, it was the final major of the year and be held for the first time over two courses, as it was postponed to December, due to the COVID-19 pandemic that postponed golf tournaments from March through June.

In 2007, international players outnumbered Americans for the first time. The 2008 tournament was won  South Korean Inbee Park, who became the event's youngest winner ever at age 19 years, 11 months, 17 days.  In 2021, Yuka Saso matched Park as the youngest winner ever.

Since 2018, the U.S. Women's Open has normally been held prior to its men's counterpart (rather than following it and the U.S. Senior Open). When announcing this schedule change, the USGA stated that it would "provide optimum playing conditions for the world's best players across a broader variety of the country's finest golf courses."

The playoff format was modified in 2018, reduced from three to two aggregate holes, followed by sudden death. The last 18-hole playoff was in 2006; the three-hole playoff was introduced the following year and used in 2011 and 2016.

Qualification
The U.S. Women's Open is open to any professional or amateur female golfer. Amateurs must have an up-to-date USGA Handicap Index not exceeding 2.4, lowered in 2014 from 4.4 in 2013. Players may obtain a place by being exempt or by competing successfully in qualifying.

In 2002, a two-stage method of qualification was introduced: 18 holes for local qualifying and 36 holes for sectional qualifying. In 2010, the qualification process reverted to a single sectional stage of 36 holes played on a single day.

The criteria for exemption from qualifying has changed through the years. In 2010, there were eleven exemption categories, including winners of the U.S. Women's Open for the last ten years, winners of the other three majors for the last five years, the top 50 from the previous year's LPGA Tour money list, the top five from the previous year's Japan LPGA Tour, Korea LPGA Tour, and Ladies European Tour money lists, and official winners of LPGA co-sponsored events for the 52-week period prior to the U.S. Women's Open.

There is no upper or lower age limit. The youngest-ever qualifiers were 11-year-old Lucy Li in 2014, and 12-year-old Lexi Thompson in 2007.

Winners of major amateur tournaments are also exempt. Currently, winners of the U.S. Girls' Junior, and U.S. Women's Mid-Amateur and the finalist of the  U.S. Women's Amateur (all USGA events) are exempt provided they did not turn professional beforehand. Winners of the Augusta National Women's Amateur Championship will qualify effective with the inaugural tournament in 2019.   The U.S. Women's Amateur champion is exempt, regardless of turning professional between the Women's Amateur and the U.S. Women's Open as a result of an August 2019 rule change by the USGA.

Winners

The number following some winners' names indicates the cumulative number of U.S. Women's Open wins for that player.

(a) = Amateur
† = Won 5 and 4 over Betty Jameson in 36-hole match play final

Multiple champions
This table lists the golfers who have won more than one U.S. Women's Open.

The defending champion has retained the title on seven occasions, most recently  in 2001:
2001 - Karrie Webb
1996 - Annika Sörenstam
1990 - Betsy King
1978 - Hollis Stacy
1973 - Susie Berning
1970 - Donna Caponi
1959 - Mickey Wright
Through 2022, three consecutive championships has not been achieved.

Future sites

Oakmont Country Club is also slated to host in 2038.
Pebble Beach Golf Links is also slated to host in 2040 and 2048.
Oakland Hills Country Club is also slated to host in 2042.
Merion Country Club is also slated to host in 2046.

Source:

See also
Golf in the United States

References

External links

United States Golf Association website

 
LPGA Tour events
Women's Open
Women's major golf championships
Open
Recurring sporting events established in 1946
1946 establishments in Washington (state)